The Joint Air Force-Weber State University Satellite (JAWSAT) is an American military mini-satellite launched aboard a Minotaur rocket on January 27, 2000 from Vandenberg Air Force Base (VAFB) in California. After its own launch, JAWSAT deployed four microsatellites: FalconSAT-1, OCSE, OPAL, and ASUSat. JAWSAT also carried NASA's Plasma Experiment Satellite Test (PEST).

See also

 2000 in spaceflight

References

Satellites orbiting Earth
Spacecraft launched in 2000
Spacecraft launched by Minotaur rockets
Amateur radio satellites